"Film-Maker // Been Training Dogs" is a 2002 double A-side single by The Cooper Temple Clause. It peaked at number twenty on the UK Singles Chart.

Each CD single was enhanced with the promo videos, on-set interviews with the band, photographs from the shoot, roll calls, and tokens.

The A-side of the 7" was double-tracked, meaning that it contained two separate groove paths, one for each of the lead tracks, which means that it is essentially down to chance whether you hear "Film-Maker" or "Been Training Dogs".

Track listing

CD1
 "Film-Maker" (Radio Edit)
 "Been Training Dogs"
 "Screwdriver Song"
 "Film-Maker" (video)

CD2
 "Been Training Dogs"
 "Film-Maker" (Album Version)
 "Safe Enough Distance Away"
 "Been Training Dogs" (video)

7"
A1. "Film-Maker"
A2. "Been Training Dogs"
B. "Way Out West" (Hightower Remix)

2002 singles
The Cooper Temple Clause songs
2002 songs